Megan Moody (born 3 November 1983) is a former British professional basketball player.

External links
Profile at fibaeurope.com

1983 births
Living people
Australian women's basketball players
British women's basketball players
Scottish women's basketball players
Australian expatriate basketball people in Spain
Australian expatriate basketball people in the United States
Australian expatriate basketball people in Turkey
British expatriate basketball people in Spain
British expatriate basketball people in the United States
British expatriate basketball people in Turkey
Fenerbahçe women's basketball players
Shooting guards
Tulsa Golden Hurricane women's basketball players